Luiz Fernando dos Santos (born 22 October 1988), simply known as Luizão, is a Brazilian footballer who plays for Altos as a striker.

Career statistics

References

External links

1988 births
Living people
Brazilian footballers
Association football forwards
Campeonato Brasileiro Série D players
Toledo Esporte Clube players
Foz do Iguaçu Futebol Clube players
Futebol Clube Santa Cruz players
Clube Atlético Votuporanguense players
Clube Atlético Juventus players
União São João Esporte Clube players
São Carlos Futebol Clube players
Fernandópolis Futebol Clube players
Mixto Esporte Clube players
Nacional Fast Clube players
Globo Futebol Clube players
Central Sport Club players
Associação Atlética de Altos players